Wapishana (Wapixana) is an Arawakan language of Guyana and Brazil. It is spoken by over 6,000 people on both sides of the Guyana-Brazil border.

In Brazil the highest concentration of Wapishana speakers are in the municipalities of Cantá and Bonfim, the Serra da Lua region, where it has been recognized as an official language since 2014.

External pressures have diminished the use of Wapishana among younger generations, and it wasn't until 1987 that Wapishana was used as the teaching language in Indigenous schools of the language community. In 2009, Roraima Federal University created an extension program for learning Wapishana. In Guyana, there are organizations for language preservation, such as Wapichan Wadauniinao Ati'o

Cultural importance 
Many plants and animals endemic to the region are only known in Wapishana, and the language has a distinct system of taxonomy. An example is the three classes of plants, karam’makau, wapaurib bau and wapananinau, which are indicative of the "cultivation criteria" of the indigenous people. Karam’makau represents plants collected in the wild, whereas wapaurib bau is the plants that have been domesticated and often bear names based on the location or farmer of origin. Cassava, a foodstuff of major importance to indigenous people of the region, has a "bewildering variety of names" in Wapishana. Wapananinau are plants with magical properties, and have important functions for shamans of the traditional beliefs.

Relation to other indigenous languages 
Kaufman (1994) considered Wapishana, Atorada, and Mapidian to be dialects.  separates Mawayana/Mapidian/Mawakwa (considered as a single language) from Wapishana, and she includes them in a Rio Branco branch. Ethnologue notes that Atorada has 50% lexical similarity with Wapishana and 20% with Mapidian, and that Wapishana and Mapidian share 10%. Ramirez (2020) considers Atorai to be a dialect of Wapishana.

Wapishana and Pemon, a Cariban language, have borrowed heavily from each other due to intensive mutual contact.

Phonology

Consonants 

 Consonants /b ɖ ʐ/ in final position are heard as voiceless [p ʈ ʂ].

Vowels

Morphology
{| class="wikitable"
|+ Wapishana personal affixes:
! !! singular !! plural
|-
! 1st person
| n-/m- -na || wa- -wi
|-
! 2st person
| ɨ-/i- -i || ɨ- -wiko
|-
! 3st person
| ɾ(ɨ/iʔ)- -sɨ || na- -nu
|-
! 3rd person refl.
| a-
|}

{| class="wikitable"
|+ Wapishana verbal affixes:
! thematic
| -ta, -ɗa, -ɓa
|-
! present
| -e
|-
! reciprocal
| -(a)ka
|-
! adjectival
| -ɾe, -ke
|}

References

Bibliography

External links 

 Wapishana dictionary The Intercontinental Dictionary Series 

Arawakan languages
Languages of Brazil
Languages of Guyana